Tracey Lee (born October 22, 1970) is an American Hip-Hop artist and entertainment lawyer. He became known in 1997 when his single "The Theme (It's Party Time)", which settled on Billboard’s Top 100 for thirty-seven weeks became an overnight hit. His debut album Many Facez followed on April 8, 1997. As a rising star in hip-hop, Tracey Lee also had the opportunity to collaborate with award-winning artists such as Busta Rhymes, Kanye West and The Notorious B.I.G., with whom he released "Keep Your Hands High". Lee also made a guest appearance on Changing Faces' "Goin' Nowhere", a song from the album All Day, All Night. Lee appeared on national television shows such as BET Rap City: The Basement, BET Teen Summit, The Keenen Ivory Wayans Show, and HBO Original Series: Arliss. Lee released his album ESQ:  The Revelation in October 2014 on his independent label LLeft Entertainment with distribution from TuneCore. He has since released two additional independent projects, Expect The Unexpected (2019) and Glory (2020). In Fall of 2016 Lee joined the faculty staff of Coppin State University as an adjunct professor teaching The Business of Music course.

Lee is a graduate of Howard University, receiving an undergraduate degree in Communication and a Juris Doctor degree from Southern University Law Center. Some of his legal clients have included: Grammy-nominated artist Eric Roberson, Invisible Productions (for Kelly Rowland, Solange Knowles and Kobe Bryant) and DJ Young Guru (tour DJ & Engineer for Jay-Z).

Discography

Albums

Singles

References

External links
 Black Enterprise Magazine: "The Many Faces of Tracey Lee: From Rapper to Attorney"

1970 births
African-American male rappers
Living people
Rappers from Philadelphia
21st-century American rappers
21st-century American male musicians
21st-century African-American musicians
20th-century African-American people